Bafra Sports Hall is a multi-purpose indoor sport venue located in Bafra district of Samsun Province, northern Turkey.

The sports hall is situated in Fatih Mah., Sedde Yolu 2. Sok. in Bafra. It hosts badminton, wrestling, taekwondo and Wushu events. Groundbreaking for the construction of the sports hall took place on May 5, 2012. It was opened on December 20, 2013. The venue has a seating capacity for 2,000 spectators, including 100 for VIP, 100 for media members, 100 for accredited sportspeople and 80 for physically handicapped people.

International events hosted
The 2008 Balkan U19 Badminton Championship was the first international sports event hosted by the old Bafra Sport Hall. In 2015, the Balkan Kungfu Wushu Championship, and International Wushu Championship were held in the sport hall. The venue will host badminton events of the 2017 Summer Deaflympics.

References

Sports venues in Samsun
Indoor arenas in Turkey
Badminton venues
Sports venues completed in 2013
2013 establishments in Turkey
Bafra